Awara Paagal Deewana (English: Wayward, Crazy, Insane) is a 2002 Indian Hindi-language action comedy film directed by Vikram Bhatt. The film's music was composed by Anu Malik, and the lyrics by Sameer. It has a plot loosely inspired by The Whole Nine Yards, and features action scenes choreograph by stunt director Dion Lam, who worked on The Matrix and Hong Kong action films. It features Akshay Kumar, Sunil Shetty, Aftab Shivdasani, Paresh Rawal, Johnny Lever, Preeti Jhangiani, Aarti Chhabria, Amrita Arora and Rahul Dev.

Awara Paagal Deewana released worldwide on 20 June, 2002, received mixed reviews from critics. The film was notable for lavish and exotic song picturizations, action scenes by Akshay Kumar and performances of Paresh Rawal and Johnny Lever.

Plot
The story centres on the legacy of a dead Indian underworld don Baba Baldev Prasad, who dies of a heart attack. He leaves diamonds worth $200mn at the New York Bank, to be distributed equally between his son Vikrant, his daughter Preeti, and Preeti's husband Guru Gulab Khatri. To claim the diamonds, all three benefactors must be present at the bank or, if dead, their death certificates must be presented.

Shortly after Don's death, Vikrant attempts to eliminate Guru by assassinating the Indian home minister in full view of television cameras while disguised as him. Guru flees to the US disguised as someone else to escape prosecution. Guru moves to the street where Anmol and his family live. Anmol recognizes him from the news. His mother-in-law forces him to go to India, along with his father-in-law, Manilal to tell Vikrant about Guru and get the reward. But everything turns wrong when Vikrant doesn't give the reward and instead sends Anmol and Manilal back to the US with his hired men, Yeda Anna and Chota Chathri to kill Guru. Later, they find out that Yeda Anna was a double agent: He was working for Guru the whole time because he offered more money. The group receive Vikrant and Preeti at the airport and drive to the hotel. At the hotel, Vikrant is kidnapped by a mysterious group of Chinese goons. Yeda Anna receives a phone call and finds out that the kidnapped Vikrant was a duplicate of the real one and the real one was going to come later by plane. They kill the second Vikrant and put his body in a car by the Brooklyn Bridge.

With Vikrant's death, Preeti and Guru each get half of the diamonds. When they are outside the bank, a group of policemen arrest them and take them to an unknown desert area. It is revealed that Vikrant is still alive and the first Vikrant was kidnapped by Chinese goons. Vikrant gets the diamonds and tries to kill Guru. A fight occurs. At the end of the fight, Guru kills Vikrant. When it's all over, they ask each other to find out who has the diamonds. Anmol has them and says he will give them to Guru if he gives Preeti a divorce. Guru arrives at the location selected by Anmol and gets the diamonds while giving Anmol the divorce papers. Yeda Anna double crosses Guru and tries to steal the diamonds. Guru wins in a fight and Yeda gives the diamonds to Guru while hanging him to a bar and having him stand on Chota Chathri's shoulders. In the end, Anmol and his love, Preeti, are seen going to India. Anmol's ex-father-in-law gives him some diamonds that he received from Guru. Preeti comments that she didn't know that Guru was so nice.

Cast
Akshay Kumar as Guru Gulab Khatri 
Suniel Shetty as Yeda  Anna
Aftab Shivdasani as Dr. Anmol Acharya
Paresh Rawal as Manilal Patel, Anmol's ex-father-in-law, Paramjeet's husband, and Mona's father.
Johnny Lever as Chhota Chhatri, a stammering goon, who is working for Yeda Anna.
Aarti Chabria as Tina Chippa, Anmol's secretary, who later marries Guru Gulab Khatri.
Preeti Jhangiani as Preeti Acharya, Baldev's daughter, Vikrant's sister, Guru Gulab's ex-wife, and Anmol's wife. She wants to end the fight between Guru Gulab and Vikrant but her efforts go in vain.
Amrita Arora as Mona Patel, Manilal and Paramjeet's daughter, Anmol's ex-wife, who constantly dominates him.
Rahul Dev as Vikrant Prasad, Baldev's son, Preeti's brother, Guru Gulab's ex-brother-in-law. He is trying to kill Guru Gulab to claim his inheritance.
Supriya Pilgaonkar as Paramjeet Patel, Manilal's wife, Anmol's ex-mother-in-law, Mona's mother. She constantly dominates Anmol and Manilal.
Om Puri as Don Baba Baldev Prasad. (cameo)
Asrani as Champaklal, Baldev's meek lawyer. (cameo)

Soundtrack
The music of the album has been composed by Anu Malik.

Critical response
Taran Adarsh of IndiaFM gave the film 2 stars out of 5, writing ″On the whole, AWARA PAAGAL DEEWANA has an excellent first half, but a just-about-okay second half. From the box-office point of view, the fabulous stunts, excellent music and an aggressive promotion will help the film reach the safety mark. Business in metros should prove to be the best. Well worth a watch!″ Anjum N of Rediff.com wrote ″Director Bhatt should concentrate on what he does best --- make small budget, non star cast films (Ghulam being an exception). Here, he shows his capability in handling the comic scenes well --- there weren't many light scenes in his earlier films. But overall, he fails to hold the audience's attention. See the film only if you are a diehard fan of Rawal's comic talent or Akshay's action scenes.

Awards

|-
| rowspan="2"|2003
| rowspan="3"|Paresh Rawal
| Filmfare Award for Best Performance in a Comic Role
| 
|-
| Zee Cine Award for Best Actor in a Comic Role
| 
|-
| rowspan="2"|2004
| rowspan="2"|Screen Award for Best Comedian
| 
|-
| Johnny Lever
| 
|}

References

External links
 

2000s Hindi-language films
Indian action comedy films
2002 films
2002 action comedy films
Films directed by Vikram Bhatt
Films set in India
Films set in the United States
Films scored by Anu Malik
2002 comedy films